Aphelia flexiloqua is a species of moth of the family Tortricidae. It is found in Yunnan, China.

References

Moths described in 1984
Aphelia (moth)
Moths of Asia